IllScarlett (styled as illScarlett) is a Canadian rock and reggae band formed in 2001. Their most prominent influence is California-based band Sublime.

The band found their break when they set up their equipment (using a generator) and played for concertgoers waiting in line to enter the 2004 Vans Warped Tour venue in Barrie, Ontario. Kevin Lyman, the Warped Tour organizer and co-owner of Warcon Enterprises, noticed them and invited them to play at his personal barbecue.  Subsequently, they were offered spots on the tour for the following two years.

IllScarlett had five major studio albums: ILLP, Clearly in Another Fine Mess, All Day With It, 1UP!, and most recently illScarlett. The album All Day With It reached gold status in Canada.

History
illScarlett was formed by drummer Swavek Piorkowski and singer/guitarist Alex Norman, who met while attending Iona Catholic Secondary School in the Clarkson area of Mississauga, Ontario. Around the same time, Norman was working at a skateboarding shop at the local mall. Norman approached a customer named Daniel Krolikowski after mistaking Krolikowski for bassist Jason "Cone" McCaslin of the popular band Sum 41; despite the mistaken identity, Norman discovered that Krolikowski also played bass guitar. The two became friends and thereafter began jamming with Piorkowski as a trio.

The name "illScarlett" was based on a local street called Will Scarlett Drive: the band stole the street sign as a prank and removed the "W", leaving the name "ill Scarlett Drive".

Soon after illScarlett was formed, the trio began to seek additional members. They recruited guitarist Will Marr and disc jockey Pat Kennedy. The band played its first show at the Horseshoe Tavern in Toronto, Ontario with stand-in John Doherty, son of singer Denny Doherty, on guitar (Doherty would notably replace Krolikowski as the band's bassist some years later).

After many performances at small venues, illScarlett went into the studio to record their first demo called the Five Dollar Demo. The demo was recorded at Metalworks Studios in Mississauga, Ontario. In 2004, the band released a full-length CD titled iLLP. Shortly after the release of ILLP, the band performed in the parking lot for the 2004 Vans Warped Tour in Barrie, Ontario. They weren't actually scheduled to play inside the venue, but they set up their equipment beside the line where people were waiting to get into Park Place for the concert, using a generator to power their equipment. IllScarlett played an hour and a half set for the concertgoers.

Within three songs, they got word from one of their friends that Sublime's old roadie who worked as tour security radioed the organizer of the Warped Tour, Kevin Lyman, telling him that there was a band sounding like Sublime playing in the parking lot powered by generators. Lyman asked the band to play at his private barbecue later that night; the band accepted his offer. After the band's performance at the barbecue, Lyman extended an invitation for the band to perform a few dates on the 2005 Vans Warped Tour.

In September 2006, the band played at the inaugural Virgin Festival in Toronto. By October 2006, the band had sold 15,000 copies of self-released CDs. On October 31, 2006, the band released the EP, EPdemic.

In August 2007 and 2008, the band played at the Cutting Edge Music Festival in Grand Bend.

In August 2009 the band played at Cutting Edge Music Festival in Kitchener.

The band finished recording their first major-label album (All Day with It) in Los Angeles, California under the production of Matthew Wilder, producer of No Doubt's diamond Tragic Kingdom album. The new album was released on July 10, 2007 across North America. The album includes such hit songs such as "Who's Got It?", "Paradise Burning", and "Life of a Soldier". Also on the album are redone versions of the songs "Nothing Special", "NTF" (Next Time Forever), "Clearer Now", and Pacino. IllScarlett toured Canada, Japan, Germany, the United States, and throughout Europe, promoting the album All Day with It.

On September 29, 2009 the band released their follow-up album to All Day with It titled 1UP!. This album featured singles such as, Take it for Granted and Milkshakes & Razorblades.

Awards and nominations

IllScarlett's song "Who's Got It" was selected as the official song for the 2007 FIFA U-20 World Cup soccer tournament hosted in Canada.

Members
Current members
 Alex Norman – lead vocals, rhythm guitars
 Swavek Piorkowski – drums
 CJ Hinds – bass guitar, backing vocals
 Jake Robertson - lead guitar

Former members
 Will Marr – lead guitar
 Justin Zoltek – guitar
 Daniel Krolikowski – bass guitar, backing vocals
 Pat Kennedy – disc jockey/turntablist
 John Doherty – bass guitar, backing vocals

Touring members
 Geoff Willingham – lead guitar (2013–2014)

Discography

Studio albums
2003: Streetsville: Masonic Lodge Handout
2004: iLLP
2006: Clearly in Another Fine Mess
2007: All Day with It (gold status in Canada)
2009: 1UP!
2014: illScarlett

EPs
2006: EPdemic
2012: 2012 EP

References

Interview with Amped Up TV (video)
Interview with Shave Magazine, Sep 2009
Interview with IllScarlett (2007)
 illScarlett continues to rock the radio and M.J.-From Torontomusicscene.ca
illScarlett are interviewed at Warped Tour 2007

External links
illScarlett Official Site
illScarlett at Myspace

Musical groups established in 2001
Musical groups from Mississauga
Canadian rock music groups
Canadian ska groups
Third-wave ska groups
Reggae rock groups
2001 establishments in Ontario